Kafarghan (also Romanized as Kāfarghān and Kāferghān; also known as Bandar-e Kāferghān) is a village in Moghuyeh Rural District, in the Central District of Bandar Lengeh County, Hormozgan Province, Iran. At the 2006 census, its population was 35, in 9 families.

References 

Populated places in Bandar Lengeh County